Chew Choon Eng (born 28 May 1976) is a former Malaysian badminton player. Currently, he is coaching Malaysian professional pair consist of 2016 Olympic Games silver medallist, Chan Peng Soon/Goh Liu Ying and Goh V Shem/Tan Wee Kiong.

Career 
He was a gold medalists at the 2002 Commonwealth Games in the men's doubles event, also at the 1999 and 2001 Southeast Asian Games in the mixed doubles and men's team events respectively. Chew won the World Grand Prix tournament in 2002 Japan Open. He competed in badminton at the 2004 Summer Olympics in men's doubles with a partner Chan Chong Ming. They defeated Theodoros Velkos and George Patis of Greece in the first round, then were defeated in the round of 16 by Zheng Bo and Sang Yang of China.

Achievements

World Championships 
Men's doubles

Asian Games 
Men's doubles

Asian Championships 
Men's doubles

Southeast Asian Games 
Men's doubles

Mixed doubles

Commonwealth Games 
Men's doubles

Mixed doubles

IBF World Grand Prix 
The World Badminton Grand Prix sanctioned by International Badminton Federation (IBF) since 1983 to 2006. The BWF Grand Prix has two levels, the Grand Prix Gold and Grand Prix. It is a series of badminton tournaments, sanctioned by the Badminton World Federation (BWF) from 2007 to 2017.

Men's doubles

  BWF Grand Prix Gold Tournament
  IBF & BWF Grand Prix tournament

References

External links 
 
 
 
 
 

1976 births
Living people
People from Penang
Malaysian sportspeople of Chinese descent
Malaysian male badminton players
Badminton players at the 2004 Summer Olympics
Olympic badminton players of Malaysia
Badminton players at the 2002 Asian Games
Asian Games bronze medalists for Malaysia
Asian Games medalists in badminton
Medalists at the 2002 Asian Games
Badminton players at the 2002 Commonwealth Games
Commonwealth Games gold medallists for Malaysia
Commonwealth Games silver medallists for Malaysia
Commonwealth Games medallists in badminton
Competitors at the 1997 Southeast Asian Games
Competitors at the 1999 Southeast Asian Games
Competitors at the 2001 Southeast Asian Games
Competitors at the 2003 Southeast Asian Games
Southeast Asian Games gold medalists for Malaysia
Southeast Asian Games silver medalists for Malaysia
Southeast Asian Games bronze medalists for Malaysia
Southeast Asian Games medalists in badminton
Badminton coaches
World No. 1 badminton players
Medallists at the 2002 Commonwealth Games